In military terms, 69th Division or 69th Infantry Division may refer to:

 Infantry divisions 
 69th Infantry Division (Germany) 
 69th Division (Imperial Japanese Army)
 69th (2nd East Anglian) Division – of the British Army in World War I
 69th Infantry Division (United States) 

 Aviation divisions 
 69th Air Division (United States)